Ogema is an unincorporated census-designated place located in the town of Ogema, Price County, Wisconsin, United States. Ogema has a post office with ZIP code 54459. As of the 2010 census, its population is 186.

References

Census-designated places in Price County, Wisconsin
Census-designated places in Wisconsin